Chalmers "Chuck" Marquis (November 12, 1926 - March 24, 2018) was an American public television and radio advocate. He was best known for his work in Washington D.C. where he was the Vice President of National Affairs at the National Association of Educational Broadcasters (NAEB), and later at PBS. He helped pass the Public Broadcasting Act of 1967 and lobbied for funding for Sesame Street. Hailed as "Public Television's voice on Capitol Hill," Chalmers was awarded the Ralph Lowell Award for his contributions to public broadcasting in 1992.

Early life 
Chalmers Marquis was born in Bloomington, Illinois on November 12, 1926 and graduated from Hyde Park High School in Chicago. In 12th grade, he had a successful nightclub routine and was recruited by the William Morris Agency to go on a national tour.

In 1944 Marquis enlisted in the U.S. Navy and served through 1946 as an electrician’s mate on LSM 484 in the Pacific. After his service, he earned degrees at the University of Chicago in 1948 and the University of Illinois in 1950 in journalism and broadcasting.

Marquis married Carolyn Gavron in Chicago in 1951, and had two sons.

Career 
Chalmers begin working at Chicago’s educational television station, WTTW. From 1955 to 1964, he rose from producer/director to director of programming. Under his direction, the station became the largest public broadcaster in the United States.

In 1965, Marquis moved to Washington, D.C. and worked for the National Association of Educational Broadcasters (NAEB), eventually becoming the VP of national affairs in 1970, where he helped establish the Educational Television Stations Program Service (later the Public Television Library), which supplied programs to public television stations. He later went on to work at PBS.

He also served as Congressional liaison for the National Association of Public Television Stations and Children’s Television Workshop, where he was able to represent the emerging medium’s interests and press House lawmakers to support legislation that eventually became the Public Broadcasting Act of 1967. Marquis expanded educational television to school classrooms across the country. As public television’s chief Congressional liaison, he also helped secure federal support for such landmark children’s programming as Sesame Street and 1-2-3 Contact.

When public TV leaders decided to create a separate organization to represent stations in Washington, Marquis moved on to the National Association of Public Television Stations. The policy organization was later renamed America’s Association of Public Television, Inc., also known as APTS.

Later life 
Marquis retired in 1991 and was honored with the Ralph Lowell Award for his contributions. He remained active, lecturing at universities and working with the U.S. State Department to help Saudi Arabia establish an educational television network. His work in public broadcasting was commemorated in the book “Televisionaries,” and his papers now reside at the University of Maryland library

A long-time D.C. area resident, Marquis lived on Lake Barcroft in Falls Church, Virginia for over 50 years, enjoying swimming and boating and volunteering for numerous organizations in the Washington area. Also a musician, Marquis played multiple instruments and marched in the Northern Virginia Firefighters Emerald Society Pipe Band for two decades before a stroke in 1994 ended his playing.

References

External links 

 "Collection: Chalmers Marquis papers | Archival Collections". archives.lib.umd.edu. Retrieved 2021-01-06. 

1926 births
2018 deaths
American radio people
University of Chicago alumni
University of Illinois alumni